King of Diamonds is an American TV series starring Broderick Crawford which ran from 1961 to 1962. It was made by Ziv-United Artists, for whom Crawford had made Highway Patrol.

Plot
Broderick Crawford stars as John King, the chief investigator for Continental Diamond Industries who travelled the world fighting unsavory gem smugglers, thieves and fences. King's colleague in detection is Al Casey played by Ray Hamilton. Syndicated, thirty minutes.

References

External links

King of Diamonds review at Mystery File

1961 American television series debuts
1962 American television series endings
1960s American drama television series
American adventure television series
Black-and-white American television shows
First-run syndicated television programs in the United States
Television series by Ziv Television Programs